David Andrews (born 23 October 1939) is a British former racing driver.

Andrews competed part-time in the World Sportscar Championship from 1985 to 1988 and the IMSA Camel GTP Championship in 1986 and 1987.

Overall Stats 

David Andrews has entered 26 races:

References

1939 births
Living people
British racing drivers
24 Hours of Le Mans drivers
IMSA GT Championship drivers
World Sportscar Championship drivers